The black-hooded sierra finch (Phrygilus atriceps) is a species of bird in the family Thraupidae.

It is found in Argentina, Bolivia, Chile, and Peru. Its natural habitats are subtropical or tropical moist montane forests and subtropical or tropical high-altitude shrubland.

References

black-hooded sierra finch
Birds of the Puna grassland
black-hooded sierra finch
Taxonomy articles created by Polbot